Linares (Llinares in asturian language) is one of 28 parishes (administrative divisions) in Salas, a municipality within the province and autonomous community of Asturias, in northern Spain.

Villages
 El Escobio (L'Escobiu)
 Folguero (Folgueiru)
 La Bouría
 La Casona
 La Estrada
 La Piniella (La Piñella)
 La Vega (La Veiga)
 Las Campas
 San Andrés
 Villar
 Villarín (Villeirín)

References

Parishes in Salas